Hannes Gideon Paaso (12 March 1908 – 6 May 1970) was a Finnish farmer, lay preacher and politician, born in Ii, Finland. He was a Member of the Parliament of Finland from 1958 to 1970, representing the Agrarian League, which renamed itself the Centre Party in 1965.

References

1908 births
1970 deaths
People from Ii
People from Oulu Province (Grand Duchy of Finland)
Finnish Lutherans
Centre Party (Finland) politicians
Members of the Parliament of Finland (1958–62)
Members of the Parliament of Finland (1962–66)
Members of the Parliament of Finland (1966–70)
20th-century Lutherans